ČSA Flight 540 was a regular international service from Prague to Tehran via Damascus and Baghdad. The flight, operated by Ilyushin Il-62 Brno Trade Fair, was on approach to runway 23R at Damascus International Airport on 20 August 1975, descending in clear weather, when it crashed  from the airport. The aircraft broke up and caught fire on impact; 126 of the 128 passengers and crew on board died in the accident in Syria's worst ever air disaster, also the worst air disaster for the airline.

The cause of the crash was determined to be the flight crew's failure to maintain the minimum flight altitude.

References

External links
 ČSA Flight 540 at PlaneCrashinfo.com

Aviation accidents and incidents in 1975
Czech Airlines accidents and incidents
Aviation accidents and incidents in Syria
1975 in Syria
Airliner accidents and incidents caused by pilot error
Airliner accidents and incidents involving controlled flight into terrain
Accidents and incidents involving the Ilyushin Il-62
August 1975 events in Asia
1975 disasters in Syria